The TR NZ class, later known as the EAR 22 class, was a class of  gauge  steam locomotives built in 1915 by Nasmyth, Wilson and Company in Patricroft, Salford, England.  The class had been ordered by the Nizam's Guaranteed State Railway (NGSR) for operation on its network in the Dominion of Nizam, better known as the Hyderabad State, in India.  However, the locomotives in the class were never delivered to the NGSR, and, in the end, served their entire working lives in Tanganyika, East Africa.

Service history
In March 1916, while the four members of the class were on their way to India, they were commandeered to assist in the British invasion of German East Africa, where they entered service with the Tanganyika Railway (TR), still carrying their NGSR lettering and numbers 1095–1098.  In the early 1930s, they were officially classified as the TR's NZ class (the NZ being a reference to "Nizam"), and renumbered as 200–203.

The class was later operated by the TR's successor, the East African Railways (EAR), as its 22 class, numbers 2201–2204.  In the late 1940s, two of them were transferred to the Southern Province Railway, an isolated network developed to support the ultimately unsuccessful Tanganyika Groundnut Scheme.  Nos 2202 and 2204 were scrapped in 1952, and 2201 and 2203 in 1956.

See also
NZ TR class
History of rail transport in Tanzania

References

Notes

Bibliography

External links

Metre gauge steam locomotives
Nasmyth, Wilson and Company locomotives
Railway locomotives introduced in 1915
Steam locomotives of Tanzania
NZ
4-8-0 locomotives
Scrapped locomotives